Høvik is a suburban area in the municipality of Bærum, Viken, Norway, in the Oslo metropolitan area. Mainly a residential area, its population (2005) is 4,311.

It is normal to divide Høvik into two parts; Nedre (lower) and Øvre (upper).

Høvik has a church, a small shopping area and a railway station, Høvik Station, served by Drammensbanen. Flytoget (Airport Express Train) does not stop at Høvik. Nearby is the Henie Onstad Kunstsenter.  There are three schools in Høvik: Ramstad Skole, Høvik Verk Skole and Høvik Skole.  There are also some important businesses with offices in Høvik, e.g. DNV.

Høvik has beaches which can be crowded during the summer.  This is a well-known recreation area all year round, attracting people from the whole of Bærum.

Høvik IF has sections for alpine skiing, bandy, association football and jogging. They play in Norwegian Bandy Premier League. In 2016 the men's team reached the quarter-final and the women's team the final.

References

Villages in Viken (county)
Bærum